HD 101917, also designated as HR 4509, or rarely 34 G. Chamaeleontis, is a solitary star located in the southern circumpolar constellation Chamaeleon. It has an apparent magnitude of 6.38, placing it near the limit for naked eye visibility. At its current distance, HD 101917's brightness is diminished by 0.28 magnitudes due to interstellar dust. It has an absolute magnitude of +2.69.

HD 101917 has a stellar classification of K0 III/IV, indicating that it is an evolved K-type star with the blended luminosity class of a subgiant and a giant star. Gaia DR3 models it to be 3.9 billion years old, enough time for it to cool and expand to 4.01 times the radius of the Sun. At present it has 126% the mass of the Sun and now radiates 9.04 times the luminosity of the Sun from its enlarged photosphere at an effective temperature , giving it a yellow hue. HD 101917 has an iron abundance 22% below solar levels, making it slightly metal deficient.

References

K-type giants
K-type subgiants
Chamaeleon (constellation)
Chamaeleontis, 34
CD-78 00476
101917
057137
4509
High-proper-motion stars